Daems is a Dutch patronymic surname. Daem or Daam is short for either Adam, Damianus, or Damasus. The surname is most common in the Belgian province of Antwerp. Daems may refer to:

Anja Daems (born 1968), Belgian television and radio presenter
Eduard Daems (1826-1879), Belgian missionary in Wisconsin
Thiry Daems, Wisconsin, named after him
Emile Daems (born 1938), Belgian road racing cyclist
Filip Daems (born 1978), Belgian footballer
Rik Daems (born 1959), Belgian painter, wine trader and politician
Willem Frans Daems (1911-1994), Dutch pharmacist, anthroposophist, pianist, teacher and editor

Dutch-language surnames
Surnames of Belgian origin
Patronymic surnames